Beech Grove is an unincorporated community in Clay Township, Morgan County, in the U.S. state of Indiana.

Geography

References

Unincorporated communities in Morgan County, Indiana
Unincorporated communities in Indiana
Indianapolis metropolitan area